Red Baron Airlines was a small U.S. regional airline based at Palm Beach International Airport and operating solely within Florida.

History
It was started as a joint venture between Clive E. Roberson and Rudolph P. Scheerer.  It was a member of the Commuter Airline Association of America.   It offered weekday flights starting in the morning from West Palm Beach, Florida and stopping in Gainesville, Florida before continuing to Tallahassee, Florida.  In the afternoon the route was the reverse.  The airline was expecting to benefit from the large number of students that would travel to/from the University of Florida in Gainesville and Florida State University in Tallahassee.  In May 1980 a Federal Aviation Administration Special Investigative Team found discrepancies in the company's maintenance manuals and recommended that a recertification be required.  On May 23, 1980, the company voluntarily ceased operations while the discrepancies were corrected.  An on-scene inspection verified these corrections and its air carrier certificate was returned on May 30, 1980.  On June 13, 1980 Scheerer Air acquired 100% of Roberson Air Inc.

The airline later became Florida Commuter Airlines. The airline name changed to Southern Airlines in 1981 shortly after their Douglas DC-3 crashed in the Bahamas on September 12, 1980.

See also 
 List of defunct airlines of the United States

References

Defunct airlines of the United States
Airlines established in 1979
Airlines disestablished in 1980
Airlines based in Florida